Louis Arthur Ducos du Hauron (8 December 1837 – 31 August 1920) was a French pioneer of color photography.

Personal life
He was born in Langon, Gironde and died in Agen.

Photography
After writing an unpublished paper setting forth his basic concepts in 1862, he worked on developing practical processes for color photography on the three-color principle, using both additive and subtractive methods. In 1868 he patented his ideas (French Patent No. 83061) and in 1869 he published them in Les couleurs en photographie, solution du problème. The discovery of dye sensitization by Hermann Wilhelm Vogel in 1873 greatly facilitated the initial three-color analysis on which all of Ducos de Hauron's methods depended.

The most widely reproduced of his surviving color photographs is the View of Agen, an 1877 image of a landscape in southern France, printed by the subtractive assembly method he pioneered. Several different photographs of the view from his attic window, one dated 1874, also survive, as do later views taken in Algeria, still life subjects, reproductions of paintings and art prints, and at least two portraits of uncertain date.

In 1891, he introduced the anaglyph stereoscopic print, the "red and blue glasses" type of 3-D print. Although others had earlier applied the same principle to drawings or used it to project images onto a screen, he was the first to reproduce stereoscopic photographs in the convenient form of anaglyph prints on paper.

Gallery

References

Further reading

External links
 

1837 births
1920 deaths
Color scientists
Pioneers of photography
19th-century French photographers